WGTT is a Christian radio station licensed to Emeralda, Florida, broadcasting on 91.5 MHz FM.  The station serves the areas of The Villages and Eustis, Florida, and is owned by Bible Clarity.

WGTT's programming includes Christian talk and teaching shows such as Revive our Hearts with Nancy Leigh DeMoss, Chuck Swindoll, and Answers in Genesis with Ken Ham.

References

External links
WGTT's official website

GTT